Killiney railway station serves Killiney in County Dublin, Ireland.

The station lies on the DART line. The entrance to the station is via Station Road. It is located about two minutes walk to Killiney Beach.

History
The original station was located on nearby Strathmore Road. The current station opened on 6 May 1882 under the name Killiney & Ballybrack, replacing both Killiney and Ballybrack stations, the Ballybrack suffix was dropped in 1921. The original Killiney station had itself replaced the earlier Obelisk Hill, Killiney station on 1 January 1858.

The station was electrified in 1983 with the arrival of DART services. The station became unmanned in 2013 and it has two automatic ticket vending machines.

Transport services 
There is no public transport to or from the station. This is served by Go-Ahead Ireland routes 45a / 45b from Kilmacanogue to Dun Laoghaire, via Bray.

A large pay and display car park is located across the road from the station.

See also 
 List of railway stations in Ireland
 Rail transport in Ireland

References

External links

Irish Rail Killiney Station Website

Iarnród Éireann stations in Dún Laoghaire–Rathdown
Railway stations opened in 1882
1882 establishments in Ireland
Killiney
Railway stations in the Republic of Ireland opened in the 19th century